İncebağ is a village in the Adıyaman District, Adıyaman Province, Turkey. Its population is 403 (2021).

The hamlet of Darıca and Serince are attached to the village.

References

Villages in Adıyaman District

Kurdish settlements in Adıyaman Province